Débranche! is a studio album by French singer France Gall, released in April 1984.

Track listing

Charts and certifications

Weekly charts

Year-end charts

Certifications

References

External links

France Gall albums
1984 albums
Warner Music Group albums
Albums produced by Michel Berger